Sareh (/Sar-eh/, ساره) is a Persian feminine given name. Notable people with the name include:

 Sareh Bayat (born 1979), Iranian actress, television host and model
 Sareh Javanmardi (born 1984), Iranian Paralympic shooter
 Sareh Nouri (born 1979), Persian-American fashion designer known for couture wedding gowns and bridal sashes

Persian feminine given names